This is a list of operas and operettas written by the French composer Edmond Audran (1840–1901).

List

References
Notes

Sources
 Lamb, Andrew (1992), 'Audran, Edmond' in The New Grove Dictionary of Opera, ed. Stanley Sadie (London) 

 
Lists of operas by composer
Lists of compositions by composer